The All Night Long Tour is the debut concert tour by British pop/R&B singer Alexandra Burke. It is Burke's first concert tour which is to promote her debut studio album Overcome. The tour is set to kick off in Wales on 14 January 2011 and currently finishes on 24 June 2011 in Ireland. The tour will visit various cities across the United Kingdom including Belfast, Dublin, Glasgow, London and Manchester. The dates for the tour was officially revealed on ITV's Daybreak website on 7 September 2010.

Inspired by musical acts such as Michael Jackson and Beyoncé, The All Night Long Tour began a year and three months after the release of the supporting album Overcome. New up and coming acts Parade and Carrie Mac were announced as the supporting acts. The set list of the tour consisted of songs from Overcome, as well as covering "Closer" by Ne-Yo, "Survivor"/"Bootylicious"/"Independent Women" by Destiny's Child and "Listen" by Beyoncé.

Background 
The tour was officially announced in September 2010 during an interview with Irish channel After Dark. It was her first headlining tour; she had previously performed on The X Factor tour and had been asked by Beyoncé Knowles to support the European leg of her I Am... Tour.

Speculation whether Burke would go on tour began in January 2010, but she stated in various interviews that she playing various summer festivals in the UK, but would not go on tour until 2010 because she did not want to perform a load of cover songs and that she wanted enough material so that she could perform her own songs. In May 2010, Burke began her tour plans and confirmed that she would be touring the following year, with tour dates being announced at the end of the current year. During her interview with After Dark she stated "I have major ideas for it and I want it to be the most incredible thing known to man, but it's going to take a lot of work." The show on 14 February in The Brighton Centre was different due to it being Valentine's Day. Tickets for show at the Oasis Leisure Centre had sold out.

Supporting acts
Parade
Carrie Mac
Olly Murs

Setlist

"Broken Heels"
"Nothing But the Girl"
"Dumb"
"Start Without You"
"Hello Good Morning" (Dancers Interlude)
"Perfect"
"Overcome"
"Closer" (Ne-Yo cover)
"Hallelujah"
"Good Night Good Morning"
Destiny's Child medley: "Survivor" / "Bootylicious" / "Listen" / "Independent Women"
"Dangerous"
"All Night Long"
"The Silence"
"Bad Boys"

Tour dates

References

External links
Official Website

2011 concert tours